The Open Castilla y León is a professional tennis tournament played on outdoor hard courts. It is currently part of the Association of Tennis Professionals (ATP) Challenger Tour and the International Tennis Federation (ITF) Women's Circuit. It has been held annually at the Villa de El Espinar in El Espinar, Segovia Province, Spain since 1986 (as a Spanish Tennis Federation event from 1986 to 1990, as a Challenger since 1991). The women's event was added to the tournament in 2015.

Past finals

Key

Men's singles

Men's doubles

Women's singles

Women's doubles

External links
Official website
ITF Search

 
ATP Challenger Tour
ITF Women's World Tennis Tour
Tretorn SERIE+ tournaments
Hard court tennis tournaments
Cas
Recurring sporting events established in 1986
Sports competitions in Castile and León